The Game of Life is the second studio album by American deathcore band Arsonists Get All the Girls. The album was released on August 14, 2007. This is the last Arsonists Get All The Girls album to feature bassist Patrick Mason due to his death in November 2007 from alcohol poisoning.

Track listing

Personnel

Arsonists Get All the Girls
Cameron Reed – vocals, keyboards
Remi Rodberg – vocals, keyboards
Arthur Alvarez – guitar
Patrick Mason – bass
Nick Cardenelli – guitar
Garin Rosen – drums

Additional musicians
Jon Rosen – piano on "So You Think You Know About the Game of Life (Party in the Rear)"
 Derek Rydquist – guest vocals on "Robando de los Muertos"
 Taylor Young – guest vocals on "Claiming Middle Age a Decade Early"

References

2007 albums
Arsonists Get All the Girls albums
Century Media Records albums